Polly Teale (born December 1962) is a British theatre director and playwright best known for her work with the Shared Experience theatre company, of which she was an artistic director.

Career
In 2002, Teale directed a production of Helen Edmundson's award-winning play The Clearing at the Tricycle Theatre. In 2012, she directed Edmundson's Mary Shelley, which was produced by Shared Experience on tour, including at the Tricycle Theatre and the Liverpool Playhouse.

Plays
 Jane Eyre (1998)
 After Mrs Rochester (2003)
 Brontë (2011)

References

External links
 Audio slideshow interview with Polly Teale talking about The Glass Menagerie on The Interview Online

1962 births
British theatre directors
Living people
Women theatre directors